Aiguo Subdistrict  is a subdistrict in Ulanhot, Inner Mongolia, China. , it administers the following four residential neighborhoods:
Wanjia Community
Chunyang Community
Puhui Community
Tao'erhe Community

See also
List of township-level divisions of Inner Mongolia

References

Township-level divisions of Inner Mongolia
Ulanhot